"Buy Dirt" is a song by American country music singers Jordan Davis and Luke Bryan. It was released on July 19, 2021 as the lead single from Davis' second studio album Bluebird Days. Davis co-wrote the song with his brother Jacob, Josh Jenkins, and Matt Jenkins (the latter two of whom are also brothers), while Paul DiGiovanni produced it. The record label is MCA Nashville. It won the Country Music Association Award for Song of the Year at the 56th Annual Country Music Association Awards.

Background
Davis and Bryan met at an awards show and later became friends. Davis told Sounds Like Nashville: "Luke isn't just a great entertainer; he's a great Dad, a great husband, and a great friend, too. That's what 'Buy Dirt' embodies. When I wrote 'Buy Dirt,' I knew he could relate to the song's message. [...] I left him a text message with the song attached and told him how much it meant to me. He got right back to me within a couple minutes and said he loved it. He wanted to live with it, make sure he would be right for the song. He called me a week later and said yes. He's one of busiest guys out there and for him to be part of it speaks for the song."

Content
Davis described the song on Today's Country Radio with Kelleigh Bannen: "'Buy Dirt' to me is about faith, family and friends, and really finding your happiness."

Critical reception
Billy Dukes of Taste of Country commented that "Buy Dirt" "paint[s] a full picture of country life and sagacity [... ,] which helps make it real to the rest of us".

Music video
The music video was released on August 10, 2021. Davis alongside Bryan illustrate the story behind the "poignant" song.

Live performance
On June 1, 2021, Davis and Bryan performed "Buy Dirt" on The Today Show.

Charts

Weekly charts

Year-end charts

Certifications

References

2021 songs
2021 singles
Jordan Davis (singer) songs
Luke Bryan songs
Male vocal duets
Songs written by Jordan Davis (singer)
Songs written by Matt Jenkins
MCA Nashville Records singles